The G05 BMW X5 is a mid-size luxury SUV produced by German automaker BMW. It is the fourth and current generation of the BMW X5. It was launched in 2018 as the successor to the F15 X5. Sales of the X5 started in November 2018. The X5 M and X5 M Competition performance models were revealed on 1 October 2019.

Development and launch 
Information on the G05 X5 was released on 6 June 2018. The G05 X5 uses BMW's Cluster Architecture (CLAR) platform also found in the G11 7 Series and G30 5 Series. Compared to its predecessor, the G05 X5 is  longer,  wider, and  shorter in height. All petrol models feature particulate filters while all diesel models feature AdBlue injection that reduces nitrogen oxide emissions.

Almost all regions feature xDrive all-wheel drive, but a rear-wheel drive sDrive model is available in the U.S. The xDrive50i model is available outside the European markets, while the European markets will get the M50i models. For the 2020 model year the M50i became available to the North American market in replacement to the xDrive50i model.

In August 2019, BMW revealed an armoured variant called X5 Protection VR6, which can withstand attacks from AK-47 bullets.

Models

X5 M 
At the 2019 Los Angeles Auto Show, for the 2020 model year, BMW released the X5 M and X5 M Competition performance variants. Both models use a 4.4 L S63 twin-turbo V8. Both models are an increase from the  produced by the previous F15 generation X5 M. In addition to the horsepower increase, major differences between the standard model and the Competition are an upgraded exhaust system, larger rear wheels and tires, Track mode, and improved standard leather upholstery.

X5 xDrive45e 
Alongside the standard petrol variants, in 2019, BMW launched the xDrive45e plug-in hybrid variant of the X5. It was later introduced to the U.S. market in the summer of 2020. The xDrive 45e features a 24 kWh lithium-ion battery combined with a 3.0 L B58 turbo I6 and an electric motor that produces . In European models, 21.6 kWh of battery capacity was usable, while in the US that figure is only 17.06 kWh. The American-market car, including its batteries, are produced at BMW's plant in Spartanburg, South Carolina.

X5 Li 
BMW released the long-wheelbase version of the X5 in China, under the model code G18. It is marketed as the X5 xDrive30Li and xDrive40Li, and has been produced by the BMW Brilliance Automotive joint venture at the upgraded Shenyang, Dadong plant since April 2022. The G18's wheelbase is  longer than the regular G05 to increase the rear passenger legroom. This is also reflected in the longer rear doors, which provide easier access to the second row of seats.

Equipment 
Standard equipment includes LED headlights, electronically controlled dampers, electric and heated sports seats, and two 12.3-inch displays for the instrument panel and iDrive system. G05 X5 models are also available with laser headlights, heated and cooled cupholders, a panoramic sunroof with LED patterns, and a Microsoft Office 365 and Skype for Business subscription with over-the-air updates. A new Digital Key system also enables a smartphone to be used as a key fob to lock or unlock the car via NFC.

xLine and M Sport packages are also offered alongside the standard trim and feature different body styling and exclusive exterior paint colours and upholstery choices. xLine models feature 19-inch alloy wheels with aluminium exterior trim, while M Sport models feature 20-inch alloy wheels with high-gloss trim.

This generation of X5 uses BMW iDrive 7.0 infotainment system, replacing iDrive 6.0 system in the previous generation. The iDrive 7.0 system now included standard wireless Apple CarPlay and Android Auto smartphone integration, which was previously optional with the iDrive 6.0 system (the iDrive 6.0 system did not offer Android Auto). The iDrive 7.0 system also integrates the BMW Assistant feature, with hands-free voice activation via the phrase, "Hey BMW".

M Performance Parts can be fitted to 25-45 models with the M Sport trim and all M50 models. These include M rims, a rear carbon fibre winglet, side skirts, carbon fibre mirrors, a front carbon fibre winglet, a sport steering wheel and carbon fibre diffuser.

The X5 M has its own M Performance Parts. These include a sport steering wheel, roof spoiler extension and carbon fibre kidney grilles.

Engine options

Petrol engines

Diesel engines

Fuel cell

Safety 
The 2018 X5 received five stars overall in its Euro NCAP test.

References

External links 
 

X5
Cars introduced in 2018
Mid-size sport utility vehicles
Luxury sport utility vehicles
Euro NCAP large off-road